"Wanderer's Nightsong" (original German title: "") is the title of two poems by the German poet Johann Wolfgang von Goethe. Written in 1776 ("") and in 1780 (""), they are among Goethe's most famous works. Both were first edited together in his 1815 Works Vol. I with the headings "" and "" ("Another one"). Both works were set to music as lieder by Franz Schubert and catalogued as D 224 and D 768.

Wanderer's Nightsong I

The manuscript of "Wanderer's Nightsong" ("") was among Goethe's letters to his friend Charlotte von Stein and bears the signature "At the slope of Ettersberg, on 12 Feb. 76"; supposedly it was written under the tree later called the Goethe Oak.
One translation is by Henry Wadsworth Longfellow:

Franz Schubert set the poem to music in 1815 (as No.3 in his Op.4, D.224), changing "stillest" and "füllest" to "stillst" and "füllst," and, more significantly, "Erquickung" (refreshment) to "Entzückung" (delight).

Wanderer's Nightsong II 

Wanderer's Nightsong II ("") is often considered the perhaps most perfect lyric in the German language. Goethe probably wrote it on the evening of September 6, 1780, onto the wall of a wooden gamekeeper lodge on top of the Kickelhahn mountain near Ilmenau where he, according to a letter to Charlotte von Stein, spent the night.

Goethe's friend Karl Ludwig von Knebel mentioned the writing in his diary, it is also documented in transcriptions by Johann Gottfried Herder and Luise von Göchhausen. It was first published—without authorization—by August Adolph von Hennings in 1800 and again by August von Kotzebue in 1803. An English version appeared in the Monthly Magazine in February 1801. The second poem was also set to music by Franz Schubert, in 1823, Op. 96 No. 3, D. 768, it has been sung by sopranos, tenors and baritones, most notably by Dietrich Fischer-Dieskau. As Goethe wrote to Carl Friedrich Zelter, he revisited the cabin more than 50 years later on August 27, 1831, about six months before his death. The poet recognised his wall-writing and reportedly broke down in tears. After 1831 the handwritten text vanished, and has not been preserved.

In popular culture 
The mountain hut had already become famous as "Goethe's Cabin" by the late 1830s. Burnt down in 1870, it was rebuilt four years later. Parodies of "" were written by Christian Morgenstern ("Fisches Nachtgesang"), Joachim Ringelnatz ("Abendgebet einer erkälteten Negerin", lines 17–20), Karl Kraus ("Wanderers Schlachtlied" from The Last Days of Mankind), and Bertolt Brecht ("Liturgie vom Hauch"). It is also cited in Daniel Kehlmann's 2005 novel Measuring the World, in Milan Kundera's novel Immortality, and in Walter Moers' novel The City of Dreaming Books.

John Ottman's musical score for Bryan Singer's 2008 film Valkyrie contains a requiem-like piece for soprano and chorus in the closing credits with "" as lyrics. In the film's context, the poem serves as a lament on the miscarried assassination on Adolf Hitler on July 20, 1944, mourns the proximate death of most of the assassins, and with the last two lines forecasts the demise of those whom they failed to kill.

References

External links
 Adaptation in English of "Wandrers Nachtlied II"

Poetry by Johann Wolfgang von Goethe
1776 poems
1780 poems
Lieder composed by Franz Schubert
Musical settings of poems by Johann Wolfgang von Goethe